Boat of Garten (originally: Garten) is a small village and post town in Badenoch and Strathspey, Highland, Scotland. In 1951, the population was less than 400; in 1971, it was almost 500; in 1981, it was almost 700, and the same in 2001.

Toponymy
Boat of Garten is also known as "Osprey village" due to its significant population of Ospreys.

Etymology
The current name of the settlement, Boat of Garten, refers to the nearby site of the old ferry over the River Spey. However, Pont's map of 1600 and Roy's map of 1750 named the location simply "Garten".

Geography
Boat of Garten is located between Aviemore and Grantown-on-Spey. It lies to the northeast of Aviemore, just north of Auchgourish and east of Kinveachy. Loch Garten lies to the southeast of the village. To the east of the village is the small settlement of Drumuillie.

Being close to the Cairngorm Mountains. it is in view of the Lairig Ghru and the northern Braeriach corries.

The area between Boat of Garten and Loch Garten is within the Abernethy Forest National Nature Reserve, Boat of Garten being on the forest fringe.

Flora and fauna
Alyssum alyssoides, Cerastium arvense, Vaccinium vitis-idaea and Koeleria macrantha are found in the village, as are Juniperus communis, Arctostaphylos uva-ursi, Empetrum nigrum and Ptilium crista-castrensis. Rare fungi include Amanita virosa, Leucocortinarius bulbiger, Pholiota spumosa, Tapinella atrotomentosa, Cantharellula umbonata, Sarcodon imbricatus, Dentipellis fragilis and Hydnellum scrobiculatum. Boat of Garten has also significant population of Ospreys.

Landmarks
St Columba's Church was built in the summer of 1900 at a cost of £820, and the church hall was added in 1934.

The village features a golf course, originally designed by James Braid.  Built in 1898, it was expanded in 1931. it has been ranked as one of the top 35 courses in Scotland.

The Community Company created a garden in 2002 and in 2013 two sculptures and an information hub commissioned by the community were installed in the Station Square, adjacent to the Community Garden.

The remains of a medieval Motte-and-bailey castle known as Tom Pitlac (or the hill of Bigla or Matilda) is located to the east of Boat of Garten, adjacent to Drumuillie. The motte is a scheduled ancient monument and is believed to date to the 12th or 13th century, with an historic link in the 15th century to Bigla, a daughter of Gilbert Cumin, Lord of Glenchearnach. Associated with the castle, to the south of Drumuillie was the Spey 'miracle Stone', a stone erected in 1865 that commemorated a local legend in which the Spey river waters were divided to allow a funeral to proceed to nearby Duthil. The commemoration stone was said to have been erected following the Disruption of 1843. The stone was inscribed by one William Grant and was erected in 1865 in memory of the wife of Patrick Grant. As it was associated with scandal, the district residents destroyed it and threw it into the river.

References

External links 
 Boat of Garten Website

Populated places in Badenoch and Strathspey